Benedikt Rúnar Guðmundsson (born 19 August 1972) is an Icelandic professional basketball coach for Úrvalsdeild karla club Njarðvík and the Icelandic women's national basketball team. He has been named Úrvalsdeild karla Coach of the Year twice: in the 2006–07 season and in the 2008–09 season,. In both seasons, he won the Icelandic men's championship KR. He has been named the Úrvalsdeild kvenna Coach of the year twice; in 2010, when he also won the Icelandic women's championship with KR, and in 2019.

Coaching career
After coaching Þór Þorlákshöfn from 2010, Benedikt took over Þór Akureyri men's and women's teams in 2015. He led the men's team to victory in Division I in 2016 and a promotion to Úrvalsdeild karla. He led the women's team to victory in Division I in 2017 but the team failed to achieve promotion til the Úrvalsdeild kvenna after losing to Breiðablik in the promotion playoffs.

In May 2017, Benedikt was hired as the head coach of KR women's team.

After guiding KR to the Úrvalsdeild playoffs in 2019, Benedikt was named the Úrvalsdeild kvenna Coach of the Year. On 11 May 2020, he announced he was leaving KR.

On 30 May 2021, Benedikt was hired as the head coach of Úrvalsdeild karla club Njarðvík. On 18 September he guided Njarðvík to a 97–93 win against Stjarnan in the Icelandic Cup final, ending the clubs 16 year major title draught. He led Njarðvík to the best record in the Úrvalsdeild, becoming the first coach to lead three different clubs to the leagues best record.

Awards, titles and accomplishments

Individual awards
Úrvalsdeild karla Coach of the year (2): 2005, 2009
Úrvalsdeild kvenna Coach of the year (2): 2010, 2019
Icelandic Women's D1 Coach of the year : 2018

Titles

Men's leagues
Icelandic champion (2): 2007, 2009
Icelandic Division I (2): 2011, 2016
Icelandic Cup (2): 1998, 2021
Icelandic Super Cup: 2007
Icelandic Company Cup: 2008

Women's leagues
Icelandic champion: 2010
Icelandic Division I: 2017, 2018
Icelandic Super Cup: 2009
Icelandic Company Cup: 2009

References

Living people
Benedikt Gudmundsson
Benedikt Gudmundsson
Benedikt Gudmundsson
Benedikt Gudmundsson
Benedikt Gudmundsson
Benedikt Gudmundsson
Benedikt Gudmundsson
Benedikt Gudmundsson
Benedikt Gudmundsson
1972 births